Panorpa subfurcata is a species of common scorpionfly in the family Panorpidae. It is found in North America.

References

Panorpidae
Articles created by Qbugbot
Insects described in 1846